Sue Carpenter (born 17 May 1956 in London, England) is a United Kingdom former newsreader and television presenter. She graduated in English Literature and Icelandic at King's College London in 1977.

After presenting regional BBC news programme Points West, Carpenter was a newsreader on the BBC's Breakfast Time from 1985 to 1986. She later joined ITN, presenting many of their main bulletins, usually during the daytime and the early evening news.

Her name is frequently mentioned, often comedically as a figure of infatuation, in the British television comedy programme series Bottom, starring Rik Mayall and Adrian Edmondson, and in one episode a signed photo of her is portrayed as a prize in a game of poker.

, Carpenter continued to present Transworld Sport on Channel Four in voice only.

References

1956 births
Living people
British television presenters
Alumni of King's College London
BBC newsreaders and journalists
ITN newsreaders and journalists